Deanna Milligan (born January 1, 1972, Vancouver, Canada) is a Canadian actress. She has appeared in numerous Canadian and American films and television shows.

Career 
Milligan had a major role playing Dave Thomas' daughter in The Beachcombers and related television films, including The New Beachcombers and A Beachcombers Christmas. She was the mystery woman in the Canadian independent short film Shoes Off!. She also costarred in the A&E TV movie Karroll's Christmas playing the girlfriend to Tom Everett Scott. Milligan also played the assistant to Santa Claus in the film Must Be Santa.

She was a regular on two short lived television shows: Northwood, where she played the troubled teen Jennifer, and Big Sound, where she played the bubbly assistant Jesse Polt to Greg Evigan. She has guest starred on shows such as The X-Files, Chris Carter's Millennium, Danger Bay, Neon Rider, 21 Jump Street, The Outer Limits, Sliders, Highlander: The Series, Da Vinci's Inquest, and Corner Gas.

Filmography

Film

Television

References

External links 
 

Canadian film actresses
Canadian television actresses
Living people
1972 births